Massimo Mazzucco (born 20 July 1954 in Turin) is an Italian filmmaker who has produced documentary films such as The New American Century and Cancer -The Forbidden Cures.  Mazzucco is also the administrator of luogocomune.net, an Italian news site concentrating mostly on the September 11 WTC attacks.

Filmography

Feature films 

 Summertime – 1982
Winner: De Sica Price, Venice Film Festival 1983.
Valencia Film Festival 1983, Sidney Film Festival 1984

 Romance – 1986
Walter Chiari, Luca Barbareschi.
Winner: Golden Globe Foreign Press (Italy)
Winner: Pasinetti Prize for Best Actor (W. Chiari) Venice Film Festival 1986.
London Film Festival 1986. Melbourne Film Festival 1986

 Hidden Lens (Obiettivo Indiscreto) – 1992
Luca Barbareschi, Sam Jenkins, Marc De Jonge.

 Shadow of a Kiss (L'Ombra Abitata) – 1994
Michael York, Charlotte Valandray, Florinda Bolkan.

 Aaron Gillespie Will Make You a Star – 1996
Scott Caan, Holly Gagnier, Scott Trost.
Final selection, Hollywood Film Festival 1996.
Montreal Film Festival 1996.

Digital format documentaries / DVD 

 Inganno Globale / Global Deceit – 2006
The first Italian film on 9/11 and broadcast by Berlusconi's Canale 5."

 The New American Century / Il Nuovo Secolo Americano – 2007
A view of America's historical, philosophical, economical and political background."

 L'altra Dallas / The Other Dallas – 2008
A documentary on the RFK assassination that claims the man convicted for the crime, Sirhan Bishara Sirhan -- could not have killed the US senator.

 I Padroni Del Mondo / The Lords of the World – 2009
A UFO history and the military and American and Russian involvement.

 Cancer: The Forbidden Cures – 2010
Claims that cures for cancer discovered in the last 100 years have been suppressed."

 The True History of Marijuana / La vera storia della Marijuana – 2011
Claims it is a conspiracy, led by the petrochemical industry, that has outlawed cannabis.

 September 11 – The New Pearl Harbor – 2013
A 5-hour documentary that claims to rebut the commonly accepted account of 911 and shows the resulting analysis by The National Institute of Standards and Technology, (NIST), to be flawed.

 American Moon – 2017
A documentary questioning the veracity of the Apollo Moon landings.

Criticism 
Some criticism was directed to Mazzucco after his decision, starting September 2008, to publicize an alternative cancer therapy based on sodium bicarbonate and proposed by Italian ex-doctor Tullio Simoncini. Said therapy is currently unproven, and Simoncini was expelled from the Italian Medical Association after he was tried and found guilty of fraud and manslaughter, since a patient died, allegedly as result of Simoncini's treatment.

References

External links 
 
 Cancer -The Forbidden Cures
 The New American Century

1954 births
Living people
9/11 conspiracy theorists
Italian conspiracy theorists
Italian film directors
Italian documentary filmmakers
John F. Kennedy conspiracy theorists
Moon landing conspiracy theorists
Film people from Turin